Leonardo Gabriel Pékarnik (born 4 August 1981) is an Argentine retired footballer.

Club career
He started his career with Club Atlético Independiente in 2000. He was part of the squad that won the Apertura 2002 tournament. In 2003, he moved to Estudiantes de La Plata but returned to Independiente in 2004.

In 2005 Pékarnik joined Defensores de Belgrano in the Argentine 2nd division, he then moved to Peru where he played for Universidad César Vallejo until the end of 2006. In 2007, he joined C.D. Luis Ángel Firpo of El Salvador where he won two Championships.

In 2009, he joined Envigado FC of Colombia.

Titles

External links
 Leonardo Pekarnik - Argentine Primera statistics at Fútbol XXI  
 Leonardo Pekarnik at BDFA.com.ar 

1981 births
Living people
Argentine footballers
Footballers from Buenos Aires
Association football midfielders
Argentine Primera División players
Argentine expatriate footballers
Club Atlético Independiente footballers
Estudiantes de La Plata footballers
Defensores de Belgrano footballers
Club Deportivo Universidad César Vallejo footballers
C.D. Luis Ángel Firpo footballers
Sportivo Belgrano footballers
San Telmo footballers
Envigado F.C. players
Categoría Primera A players
Argentine expatriate sportspeople in Peru
Argentine expatriate sportspeople in El Salvador
Argentine expatriate sportspeople in Colombia
Expatriate footballers in Peru
Expatriate footballers in El Salvador
Expatriate footballers in Colombia